Lucanthone is a drug used to treat parasitic diseases such as bilharziasis and schistosomiasis It is a prodrug and is converted to the active metabolite hycanthone.

Mechanism of action

Hycanthone binds to acetylcholine receptors in the worm and results in increased sensitivity to stimulation by 5-HT causing increase in motility, paired worms are separated and reproduction is stopped. It causes damage of the integument and vitelline duct.

References 

Antineoplastic drugs
Thioxanthones